Pyrausta violascens is a moth in the family Crambidae. It was described by George Hampson in 1918. It is found in Ghana.

References

Endemic fauna of Ghana
Moths described in 1918
violascens
Moths of Africa